Walter de Scauren was an English medieval university chancellor.

Walter de Scauren became Chancellor of the University of Oxford on the 10th of June 1341 after the cession of William de Skelton.

References

Year of birth unknown
Year of death unknown
Chancellors of the University of Oxford
14th-century English people
14th-century Roman Catholics